Optical engineering is the field of science and engineering encompassing the physical phenomena and technologies associated with the generation, transmission, manipulation, detection, and utilization of light.  Optical engineers use optics to solve problems and to design and build devices that make light do something useful.  They design and operate optical equipment that uses the properties of light using physics and chemistry, such as lenses, microscopes, telescopes, lasers, sensors, fiber optic communication systems and optical disc systems (e.g. CD, DVD).

Optical engineering metrology uses optical methods to measure either micro-vibrations with instruments like the laser speckle interferometer, or properties of masses with instruments that measure refraction

Nano-measuring and nano-positioning machines are devices designed by optical engineers. These machines, for example microphotolithographic steppers, have nanometer precision, and consequently are used in the fabrication of goods at this scale.

See also
Optical lens design
Optical physics
Optician

References

[1] Walker, Bruce H (1998). Optical Engineering Fundamentals. SPIE Press. p. 1. .

[2] Walker, Bruce H (1998). Optical Engineering Fundamentals, SPIE Press. p. 16. .

[3] Manske E. (2019) Nanopositioning and Nanomeasuring Machines. In: Gao W. (eds) Metrology. Precision Manufacturing. Springer, Singapore.  .

[4] "ESO Awards ELT Sensor Contract to Teledyne e2V". www.eso.org. Retrieved 22 May 2017.

Further reading
 Driggers, Ronald G. (ed.) (2003). Encyclopedia of Optical Engineering. New York: Marcel Dekker. 3 vols. 
 Bruce H. Walker, Historical Review,SPIE Press, Bellingham, WA.   
 FTS Yu & Xiangyang Yang (1997) Introduction to Optical Engineering, Cambridge University Press, .
 Optical Engineering (ISSN 0091-3286)

Engineering
Engineering disciplines